I Get Joy is a studio album by Al Green, released in 1989 on A&M Records. Green included many secular songs on the album, the first time he had done so since the 1970s.

Production
Green wrote the majority of the songs. "As Long As We're Together" features Al B. Sure! singing backup. Former Tempree Jasper "Jabbo" Phillips sings backup on "Tryin' to Do the Best I Can" and "Tryin' to Get Over You".

Critical reception
Robert Christgau wrote: "What distinguishes this exercise is unflinching formal exposition--no Supremes or James Taylor ringers. Even the electrofunk belongs." The Deseret News thought that Green "has a knack for writing songs that are subtle enough to work on both romantic and religious levels." The Los Angeles Times opined that "Green should stick to what he does best, which, these days, is religious music." The New York Times called Green's voice "the sound of a lone supplicant, gently testifying to the comforts of faith."

Track listing
"You're Everything to Me" (Al Green, Denise Flippen) - 4:13
"All My Praise" (Green, Flippen) - 4:10
"The End Is Near" (Green, Flippen) - 4:06
"Mighty Clouds of Joy" (Buddy Buie, Robert Nix) - 4:16
"I Get Joy" (Green, Flippen) - 3:53
"As Long as We're Together" (Green)- 3:44
"Praise Him" (Green) - 3:06
"Blessed" (Eban Kelly, Jimi Randolph) - 4:06
"Tryin' to Do the Best I Can" (Green) - 3:03
"Tryin' to Get Over You" (Green) - 2:04

Personnel 
 Al Green – lead vocals, arrangements (1-7, 9, 10), backing vocals (6, 8)
 Lester Snell – keyboards (1, 2, 3, 5, 7)
 Wayne Perkins – acoustic piano (4), lead guitar (4)
 Lawrence Mitchell – keyboards (6), horns (6)
 Jimi Randolph – all instruments (8), arrangements (8)
 Johnny Brown – acoustic piano (9), organ (10)
 Angelo Earl – guitars (1, 2, 3, 5, 7)
 Gregory McIntosh – lead guitar (9, 10)
 Jimi Kinnard – bass (1, 2, 3, 5, 7)
 George Jouringan – bass (4, 9, 10)
 Archie Mitchell – drums (1, 2, 3, 5, 6, 7), bass (6)
 Tim Dancy – drums (10)
 Dennis Bates – horns (9)
 Berton Brown – backing vocals (1, 2, 3, 5, 7)
 William Brown III – backing vocals (1, 2, 3, 5, 7)
 Gloria Robinson – backing vocals (1, 2, 3, 5, 7)
 Harvey Jones – backing vocals (4, 9, 10)
 Linda Jones – backing vocals (4, 9, 10)
 Monique Monan – backing vocals (4)
 Reba Russell – backing vocals (4)
 Michael Allen – backing vocals (6)
 Denise Flippen – backing vocals (6)
 John Benton – backing vocals (8)
 Berkley Buckley – backing vocals (8)
 Eban Kelly – backing vocals (8), arrangements (8)
 P. Leon Thomas – backing vocals (8)
 Jasper "Jabbo" Phillips – backing vocals (9, 10)

Production 
 Al Green – executive producer, producer, engineer 
 Paul Zeleski – producer 
 Eban Kelly – producer (8), assistant engineer (8)
 Jimi Randolph – producer (8), engineer (8)
 William Brown III – engineer 
 Willie Mitchell – engineer 
 Robert Nix – engineer (4)
 Kim Venable – engineer (4)
 John Eberle – mastering 
 Chuck Beeson – art direction, design 
 Jeff Gold – art direction
 Howard Rosenberg – photography

References

Al Green albums
1989 albums
A&M Records albums